New Mexico State Road 159 (NM 159) is a  state road located entirely within Catron County, New Mexico, United States. NM 159's western terminus is at U.S. Route 180 (US 180) south of Alma. It heads east via Mogollon to a few miles past Willow Creek Campground in Gila National Forest where it continues as Catron County Route 28 (CR 28), which is also known as Burnsum Road.

Route description

NM 159 begins at a junction with US 180 between the communities of Alma to the north and Glenwood to the south. The route heads east-northeast through a sparsely populated semi-arid region until it reaches a junction with Forestry Trail 586, which goes south to NM 174. Past this junction, the route continues its east-northeast trajectory into a mountainous area. After following a winding path through the mountains, the highway reaches Mogollon, a historic mining town.

East of Mogollon, the highway becomes an unpaved, rough single-lane road known as Bursum Road. This section of the road is also twisting and mountainous, and it is closed in winter due to the risk of icy, snowy conditions. The road continues east to Willow Creek Campground in Gila National Forest, where state maintenance ends.

Major intersections

See also

 List of state roads in New Mexico

References

External links

159
Transportation in Catron County, New Mexico
Gila National Forest